Alex Ferrari is a Brazilian singer, songwriter and producer known for "Bara Bará Bere Berê" that reached number-one on the official French Singles Chart.

Songwriting
Ferrari has also written a number of songs, notably "Gatinha assanhada" (co-written with Gabriel Valim) that became a hit for sertanejo singer Gusttavo Lima in Brazil reaching the Brazilian Top 10. It also appears on Lima's 2012 live album Ao Vivo em São Paulo.

Discography

Albums

International singles

References

External links
Official website

21st-century Brazilian male singers
21st-century Brazilian singers
Living people
People from Rondônia
1982 births